The Howard School is a boys' secondary school in Rainham, Kent, England, with approximately 1,500 pupils. It offers a partially selective system and is one of only five bi-lateral schools in the United Kingdom. The partially selective system permits admission to the grammar school section by the 11-Plus selection, however a passing mark is not required if the pupil is seen to have the ability to work in the 'grammar stream', and non-selective admission to the high school. The school is a Sports College.

History
The school was named after Dorothy Howard, who played a major part in the local community, and was established in 1975 by amalgamating Rainham Boys' Secondary School and Gillingham Boys' Grammar School to form a bi-lateral school.

The Howard School became a grant-maintained school in 1994 when it left the control of Kent County Council. Following a change of central government it became a foundation school in 1998. Although a foundation school, the school works closely with Medway Council, which, since becoming a unitary authority in 1998, oversees education in the Medway Towns.

The school became a Specialist Sports College in 2007. In 2008, and again in 2013 and 2016 it received a "good" rating from Ofsted inspectors. This is a change since 2002, when Ofsted inspectors gave a "Serious weaknesses" rating.

The Howard Academy Trust
The school converted to academy status in October 2014 and further converted to Multi-Academy Trust status in December 2015. Temple Mill Primary School, Strood, joined the Trust at the same time as the conversion to MAT and Deanwood Primary School, Parkwood, Rainham, joined the Trust in September 2016.

Waterfront UTC, formerly Medway UTC, a University technical college in Chatham, joined the Trust in 2018.

Sports College
The school is a Sports College. Since becoming a Sports College, the school has developed its sporting facilities, including:
 Building a "5 a-side" football complex
 Building a ibrary and improving ICT facilities
 Renovating the sports blocks, changing facilities and sports halls
 Developing one of the best table tennis centres in the UK, used during the prelude to the London 2012 Olympic Games by various national teams, located at the top of the school grounds.

Notable former pupils

 Rik Waller, singer
 George Boyd, footballer
 Matt Haines, professional golfer
 Derek Hales, footballer
Zech Medley, footballer
 Luis Binks, footballer

Howard School
 Gary Rhodes, chef
 Douglas Hodge, actor

Gillingham Boys' Grammar School
 David Frost, broadcaster
 David Harvey, geographer

See also
 Gillingham School (also former Gillingham Grammar School) in Gillingham, Dorset.

References

External links

EduBase
The Howard Academy Trust

Bilateral schools in England
Educational institutions established in 1975

Secondary schools in Medway
1975 establishments in England
Academies in Medway
Gillingham, Kent